Descente aux enfers (Descent into Hell) is a 1986 French film directed by Francis Girod. Based on the 1955 novel The Wounded and the Slain by David Goodis, it is a psychological thriller set under the sun and heat of the Caribbean. A married couple, she (Sophie Marceau) with a dark secret in her past and he (Claude Brasseur), an author suffering from both writer's block and alcoholism, undergo experiences which strain their relationship to breaking point but in the end, though each will have to live with the consequences, they are reunited.

Plot
Staying in a luxurious hotel in Port-au-Prince are the beautiful and sensual Lola, aged about 20, and her husband Alan, a pulp writer some thirty years older. The stay was meant to give him the opportunity to start a new book, but he spends much of the time drinking. Frustrated at his behaviour, she starts an affair with a French fellow guest. Drunk in an empty street, Alan is attacked but, defending himself with an empty bottle, leaves his assailant dead. A witness, Théophile, offers to keep quiet for a huge sum in cash, upon which he will return the bottle. Selling her jewels, Lola raises the money and throws the bottle into the sea. Not satisfied that this is the end of the story, Alan confesses to the police, who do not believe him because he can produce no proof of the killing and they have already locked up a suspect. Alan then goes to Théophile to urge him to testify, but the man attacks him and in the ensuing struggle is left nearly dead. The film ends with Alan in hospital and Lola, whose deep bond with him has been renewed, at his bedside.

Cast
 Claude Brasseur as Alan Kolber
 Sophie Marceau as Lola Kolber
 Betsy Blair as Mrs. Burns
 Hippolyte Girardot as Philippe Devignat
 Sidiki Bakaba as Theophile Bijou
 Gérard Rinaldi as Elvis
 Marie Dubois as Lucette Beulemans

Claude Braseur and Sophie Marceau had played the leads in two other films, which had attained great popularity in France: La Boum (1980) and its sequel, La Boum 2--where they played father and daughter. Their performance in Descente, given their age difference (thirty years) and the nude scenes, led to media discussions and allegations--that Brasseur had no credibility playing Lola Kolber's lover after having played her father, and that Marceau had been forced to skip enjoying her youth.

Brasseur said, in an interview with Europe 1, "Jouer le père de Sophie Marceau dans La Boum... puis son amant dans Descente aux enfers quatre ans plus tard, est un choix qui m'a coûté très cher. Ça n’a pas surpris, ça a choqué. Quand Descente aux enfers est sorti, il y a eu une profusion de courriers adressés à Gaumont, à Sophie et moi. C'est tout juste si on ne m’accusait pas d’inceste." Girod, on the DVD Descente aux enfers (StudioCanal, 2005), commented, "Après avoir convaincu Sophie Marceau de tourner des scènes de nudité pour les besoins du film, mon mauvais esprit m'a poussé à proposer à Claude Brasseur le rôle de son mari. Ce qui m'amusait beaucoup parce qu'il sortait des Boum où il jouait le père de Sophie. D'ailleurs, entre nous sur le tournage, on appelait Descente aux enfers… La Boum X (rires). […] Cela a moins amusé un certain nombre de spectateurs groupies de Claude Brasseur qui lui ont envoyé des lettres d’insultes, au moment de la sortie du film ('Salaud ! Tu n’as pas honte ?')."

Music
The CD soundtrack was composed by Georges Delerue.

References

External links
 

1986 drama films
1986 films
1980s French-language films
Films scored by Georges Delerue
Films directed by Francis Girod
Films set in Haiti
French drama films
Films based on American novels
Films with screenplays by Jean-Loup Dabadie
1980s French films